The  Arizona Rattlers season was the 22nd season for the franchise Arena Football League, coming off of their victory in ArenaBowl XXV. The team was coached by Kevin Guy and played their home games at the US Airways Center. With a 15–3 record, the Rattlers won their fourth consecutive division title to qualify for the playoffs. The Rattlers successfully defended their championship in ArenaBowl XXVI by once again defeating the Philadelphia Soul by a 48–39 score to win their fourth ArenaBowl championship in franchise history.

Final roster

Standings

Regular season schedule
The Rattlers began the season at home against the Philadelphia Soul on March 23 in a rematch of ArenaBowl XXV. They closed the regular season on the road against the Iowa Barnstormers on July 27.

Playoffs

References

Arizona Rattlers
Arizona Rattlers seasons
2013 in sports in Arizona
2010s in Phoenix, Arizona
ArenaBowl champion seasons